Milon B.C. or Milonas B.C. is a professional basketball team that is based in Nea Smyrni, Athens, Greece. It is a part of the multisport club AONS Milon. The club's home arena is the Milon Indoor Hall, which is also located in Nea Smyrni. The team's colours are green and black.

History
The basketball section of the club was founded in the year 1937, nine years after the official founding of the parent athletic club (AONS Milon was founded in 1928). Milon played for many years in the second-tier division of Greece (Greek A2 League), and Greek B National League, in earlier years. The club achieved promotion to the top-tier level Greek Basket League for first time, in the 1993–94 season. That season, Milon had the top scorer of the Greek League championship, Mitchell Wiggins, but didn't achieve to remain in the first division, and was relegated down again to the Greek A2 League.

The club returned to the top Greek division in the 2000–01 season. That was the club's last season in the first division. During those years, several well-known players played in Milon, such as Mitchell Wiggins, Ioannis Sioutis, Vangelis Sklavos, and others. In recent years, the club has played in the lower level tiers of the Greek basketball league system.

In the 2010 season, Milon was relegated in the A ESKANA (local regional championship of Athens, or the 5th tier of the Greek basketball league system).

After almost a decade in regional championship, Milon was promoted to Greek C National League in 2019.

During 2020-2021 season Milon was leading, unbeatable in 3 games, the Greek C Basket League (2nd Group), which was canceled due to the COVID-19 pandemic.

Arena

Milon plays its home games at the 1,200-seat Milon Indoor Hall.

Roster
2021-2022 Season

Head Coach:
Nikos Karagiannis

Team Manager:
Nikos Psileas

Team Players

Nikos Kokkalis
Spyros Motsenigos
Dimitris Benos
Ilias Petridis
Giorgos Christopoulos
Vaggelis Papapetros
Dionisios Theodoritsis
Nikolas Protogeros

Notable players

 Ioannis Sioutis
 Vangelis Sklavos
 Nikos Psileas
 Kostas Batis
 Kendrick Johnson
 Mitchell Wiggins

Head coaches
 David Stergakos
 Nikos Karagiannis
 Nikos Pavlou
 Dimitris Aposkitis

References

Basketball teams in Greece
Basketball teams established in 1937
Nea Smyrni